Freshman Year is a 1938 film, notable as the uncredited film debut of actor Arthur O'Connell.

References

External links
Freshman Year at IMDb
Freshman Year at TCMDB

1938 films
American romantic musical films
American black-and-white films
1930s romantic musical films
Films directed by Frank McDonald
1930s American films